Rigau is a surname of Catalan-language origin. Notable people with the surname include:

Alfredo Rigau (born 1960), Spanish sailor
Carme García Rigau (born 1974), Spanish para-alpine skier and journalist
Félix Rigau Carrera (1894–1954), Puerto Rican pilot
Irene Rigau, Catalan nationalist politician
Jorge Rigau (born 1953), Puerto Rican architect and author
Marco Antonio Rigau (born 1946), Puerto Rican politician and attorney
Marco Rigau Gaztambide (1919–1985), Puerto Rican lawyer

See also
Rīgāu, village in Rudkhaneh District, Hormozgan Province, Iran

References

Catalan-language surnames